The Maironis Lithuanian Literature Museum is located in the Siručiai Palace of Kaunas, Lithuania. The place where it is established was built in 1742 by Kaunas city court foreman Simonas Sirutis and was purchased by Jonas Mačiulis-Maironis in 1909.

See also 
 List of music museums

References

External links
 Official website of the Maironis Lithuanian Literature Museum

Museums in Kaunas
Literary museums in Lithuania